Ed is a locality and the seat of Dals-Ed Municipality in Västra Götaland County, Sweden. It had 2,932 inhabitants in 2010. It is the only locality in the municipality.

References

External links

Municipal seats of Västra Götaland County
Swedish municipal seats
Populated places in Västra Götaland County
Populated places in Dals-Ed Municipality
Dalsland